is the fifth full-length album by Japanese novelty heavy metal band Animetal, released through VAP on June 25, 2003. The album consists of a non-stop marathon of metal covers: tracks cover anime themes from the 1960s to the 1990s, while tracks 18-34 cover tokusatsu themes also from that same era, including Super Sentai and Kamen Rider titles, and tracks 35-39 are covers of themes from Tatsunoko's Time Bokan series. Prior to the release of this album, guitarist She-Ja left the band. He was replaced by Syu, who has worked with metal bands Galneryus and Aushvitz.

The album cover depicts the band trio as the Black Tri-Stars of the Mobile Suit Gundam series.

Animetal Marathon V was released in the European market by Wasabi Records in 2006, with an anime-oriented cover art. A limited edition release included a bonus DVD.

Track listing 
All tracks are arranged by Syu, Masaki, Katsuji, and Yorimasa Hisatake.

Personnel
 - Lead vocals
Syu - Guitar
Masaki - Bass

with

Katsuji - Drums

Footnotes

References

External links

2003 albums
Animetal albums
Japanese-language albums
Covers albums